The Italian honours system is a means to reward achievements or service to the Italian Republic, formerly the Kingdom of Italy including the Italian Social Republic.

Orders of chivalry

Italian Republic 
There are five orders of knighthood awarded in recognition of service to the Italian Republic. Below these sit a number of other decorations, associated and otherwise, that do not confer knighthoods. The degrees of knighthood, not all of which apply to all orders, are Knight (Cavaliere abbreviated Cav.), Officer (Ufficiale abbreviated Uff.), Commander (Commendatore abbr. Comm.), Grand Officer (Grand'Ufficiale, abbr. Gr. Uff.), Knight Grand Cross (Cavaliere di Gran Croce, abbr. Cav. Gr. Croce) and Knight Grand Cross with cordon (Cavaliere di Gran Croce con cordone). 

Italian citizens may not use within the territory of the Republic honours or distinctions conferred on them by non-national orders or foreign states, unless authorised by Ministry of Foreign Affairs. The use of awards of the Holy See (including the Equestrian Order of the Holy Sepulchre) is to be authorized by Presidency of the Council of Ministers, while the use of those of the Sovereign Military Order of Malta, enjoying formal recognition in Italy, do not need any authorization to boast. 

The Royal House of Savoy, Italy's former Royal Family, also continues to bestow knighthoods in three orders of chivalry previously recognised by the Kingdom of Italy. In fact, Umberto II, the last King of Italy did not abdicate, and so he preserved his fons honorum: today the Grand Mastership of the orders remain under the prerogatives of Head of the House of Savoy, claimed between Vittorio Emanuele, Prince of Naples and Aimone, Duke of Aosta. Today these continue merely as dynastic orders of the Royal House in exile. While their bestowal is suppressed by law in Italy, the use of those decorations conferred prior to 1951 is recognised, exclusive of any right of precedence in official ceremonies. However the Savoy orders, are theoretically recognized by the Holy See amongst others, for example the Order of Saints Maurice and Lazarus were recognized by papal bull of Pope Gregory XIII, where he bestowed upon Emmanuel Philibert, Duke of Savoy and his Savoy successors, the right to confer this knighthood in perpetuity. 

The House of Bourbon-Two Sicilies from the Kingdom of the Two Sicilies additionally continues to bestow knighthoods, including the Sacred Military Constantinian Order of Saint George which is fully recognised by the Italian republic. Also the Houses of Bourbon-Parma and Habsburg-Tuscany continues to do so.

The Kingdom of Italy 

The Sardinian orders of the Most Holy Annunciation, of Saints Maurice and Lazarus and the Military and Civil orders of Savoy were continued on the unification of Italy in 1861. These were augmented during the Liberal period by the Order of the Crown of Italy, the Chivalrous Order of Agricultural, Industrial and Commercial Merit, the Colonial Order of the Star of Italy and later, by the Civil and Military Order of the Roman Eagle. In contrast to the Republican orders, the feminine style Dama is used for women.

The Knight Bachelor, usually transmitted by male primogeniture, was similar to a British baronetcy but older. These Cavaliere Ereditario were not, however, members of an order of chivalry.

The Kingdom of two Sicilies

Decorations

Italian Republic

Medals

Medals of Merit 
 War Merit Cross
 Army Cross of Merit
 Navy Cross of Merit
 Air Force Cross of Merit
 Carabinieri Cross of Merit
 Financial Guard Cross of Merit
 Civil Merit Cross
 Labour Merit Star
 Medal of Merit for Culture and Art

Service medals 
 Maurician medal

See also
 Nobility of Italy
 Italian honorifics
 Order (distinction)
 List of honours of Italy awarded to heads of state and royalty

Footnotes

References

External links

 Presidenza della Repubblica – Le Onorificenze 
 Ordini dinastici della Real Casa di Savoia 

 

Italy